The Porsche 910 or Carrera 10 was a race car from Porsche, based on the Porsche 906. 29 were produced and were raced in 1966 and 1967. The factory name for the 910 was the 906/10. The 910 was considered the next sequence in the 906 line.

History 

The main difference to the original 906 is the use of 13 inch wheels and tyres as in Formula One (F1), plus a single central nut instead of the five nuts as in a road car. This made the car unsuitable for street use, but it saved time in pitstops. Overall, the 910 was lighter and shorter than the 906.

The Porsche 910 was entered in mid 1966, starting with the 1966 European Hill Climb Championship from Sierre to Crans-Montana in Switzerland. The 8 cylinder version was referred to as 910/8. The Porsche 910 is 4113 mm long, 1680 mm wide and only 980 mm high.

Racing history 

The 910 was only raced for about one year by the factory. The main class rivals were the Ferrari Dino 206P, overall victories on fast tracks against the much more powerful and faster Ford GT40 for example, or another class competitor Ferrari Prototypes proved unrealistic.

At the 1000 km Nürburgring in 1967, a fleet of six factory cars were entered in an attempt to score the first overall win in Porsche's home event. Two of the three 8-cyl broke, and the remaining one finished fourth. The three 6-cyl won 1-2-3, though, giving Porsche its first outright win in a third major event of the World Sportscar Championship for Porsche, after the 1956 Targa Florio and the 12 Hours of Sebring in 1960.

In Le Mans, the new Porsche 907 "long tails" were already entered, finishing 5th in front of a 910 and two 906.

In hillclimbing, the career of the short and light open-top 910/8 "Bergspyder" version with its 8-cylinder continued, winning the 1967 and 1968 European championships. At the hillclimb of Ollon-Villars, which counted towards the World Sportscar Championship in 1967, the 910 even scored a 1-2, with Gerhard Mitter and Rolf Stommelen beating Herbert Müller and his big V12-Ferrari P.

Notes

Group 4 (racing) cars
Sports prototypes
24 Hours of Le Mans race cars
910
Rear mid-engine, rear-wheel-drive vehicles